The 2008-09 season in Danish 2nd Division will be divided in two groups. The two winners will be promoted to the 2009–10 Danish 1st Division, together with the winner of a promotion game between the two runners-up. Second squad teams are ineligible for promotion.

Participants

East

League table

Results

Top goalscorers
Last updated: 9 June 2009; Source: Danish Football Association

West

League table

Results

Top goalscorers
Last updated: 9 June 2009; Source: Danish Football Association

Play-offs

Promotion game
The two runners-up will play promotion game on home and away basis.

First leg

Second leg

Relegation game
The two teams placed 15th in each group will play relegation game on home and away basis.

First leg

Second leg

External links
  Danish FA

Danish 2nd Division seasons
3
Danish